The 1957 Major League Baseball season was played from April 15 to October 10, 1957.  The National League's Brooklyn Dodgers and New York Giants played their final seasons as New York City-based franchises before their moves to California for the 1958 season, leaving New York City without a National League team until the birth of the Mets in 1962.

Awards and honors
Baseball Hall of Fame
Sam Crawford
Joe McCarthy
MLB Most Valuable Player Award
 American League: Mickey Mantle, New York Yankees, OF
 National League: Hank Aaron, Milwaukee Braves, OF
MLB Rookie of the Year Award
 American League: Tony Kubek, New York Yankees, SS
 National League: Jack Sanford, Philadelphia Phillies, P
Cy Young Award
Warren Spahn, Milwaukee Braves (NL)
The Sporting News Player of the Year Award
Ted Williams, Boston Red Sox
The Sporting News Pitcher of the Year Award
American League: Billy Pierce, Chicago White Sox
National League: Warren Spahn, Milwaukee Braves
The Sporting News Manager of the Year Award
Fred Hutchinson, St. Louis Cardinals
Gold Glove Award
Gil Hodges (1B) (NL) 
Nellie Fox (2B) (AL) 
Frank Malzone (3B) (AL) 
Roy McMillan (SS) (AL) 
Willie Mays (OF) (NL) 
Al Kaline (OF) (AL) 
Minnie Miñoso (OF) (AL)
Sherm Lollar (C) (AL) 
Bobby Shantz (P) (AL)

Statistical leaders

Standings

American League

National League

Postseason

Bracket

Managers

American League

National League

Records and notable events
The 1957 season marked the first time that both the American and National League leader in Complete Games had less than 20 Complete Games to lead their league.

Home Field Attendance

Events

January–March

April–June
April 18 – New York City Parks Commissioner Robert Moses proposes a new  tract in Flushing Meadows as a site for a new National League baseball stadium. The plan, submitted to mayor Robert Wagner, includes a 50,000-seat stadium with a plastic dome to be built by the Parks Department.
April 21 – The Cincinnati Redlegs are involved in a bizarre play in a game against the host Milwaukee Braves. With Don Hoak on second and Gus Bell on first, Wally Post hits a ground ball to Milwaukee shortstop Johnny Logan. Hoak breaks up a potential double play by fielding the ball himself and flipping it to Logan. Hoak is called out for interference (contact with batted ball before a fielder touched it), but Post is given a single on the play. The day before, Johnny Temple let Bell's ground ball hit him with the same result, Temple being called out for interference and Bell being awarded a single. The two incidents prompt league presidents Warren Giles and Will Harridge to jointly announce a rule change that declared both the runner and batter out if the runner intentionally interfered with a batted ball, with no runners allowed to advance.
April 22 – John Irvin Kennedy becomes the first black player in Philadelphia Phillies history, entering the game in the top of the 8th inning as a pinch runner for Solly Hemus.
April 24 – The New York City Board Of Estimates fails to act on the Moses plan as outlined by Mayor Wagner.
May 7 – Cleveland Indian pitcher Herb Score is hit in the face by a line drive by New York Yankee Gil McDougald, the ball breaking numerous bones in Score's face and leaving him quite bloodied. McDougald vows to quit if Score is blinded as a result. Score regains his 20/20 vision, but will miss the remainder of the 1957 season.
May 10 – San Francisco mayor George Christopher confers with Giants owner Horace Stoneham on a possible move of the New York Giants franchise to the West Coast.
May 28 – The National League approves the proposed moves of the Giants and Brooklyn Dodgers to the West Coast, provided both clubs make their request before October 1 and move at the same time.
May 29 – New York City mayor Robert Wagner says he plans to confer with the Giants and Dodgers about the proposed move, but that the city will not be "blackjacked" into anything.
May 30 – Dodgers owner Walter O'Malley rejects an offer from a Queens group to buy the team.
June 9 – Ernie Banks hits 100th career home run helping Chicago Cubs beat Philadelphia Phillies 7–3.

July–September
July 18 – Horace Stoneham states the Giants will leave New York after the season. He says he has not heard anything more from San Francisco and that his move is not contingent on that of the Dodgers.  Stoneham sees a new stadium or joint occupancy with the New York Yankees as the only reason for the Giants to stay in New York.
July 26 – Mickey Mantle hits 200th career home run.
August 19 – As Stoneham cites poor attendance as the reason for the Giants' move, the team's board of directors votes 8–1 to move to California in 1958, as San Francisco promises a new stadium in the Bayview area. The only dissenting vote is by M. Donald Grant, who would go on to become one of the founders of the New York Mets.
August 20 – Bob Keegan of the Chicago White Sox no-hits the Washington Senators 6–0 in the second game of a doubleheader at Comiskey Park. The no-hitter is the first by a White Sox pitcher since Bill Dietrich in 1937.
September 5 & 6 – the only time that a walk-off home run is hit in consecutive days by a pitcher. Bob Grim homers for the New York Yankees against the Boston Red Sox, followed the next day by Dixie Howell homering for the Chicago White Sox against the Kansas City Athletics.
September 14 – Ernie Banks hits 3 home runs helping Chicago Cubs beat Pittsburgh Pirates 7–3.
September 23 – The Milwaukee Braves clinch the National League pennant at Milwaukee County Stadium after Braves slugger (and eventual 1957 National League MVP) Hank Aaron clubs a two-run walk-off home run off of Billy Muffett in the bottom of the 11th inning to give Milwaukee a 4–2 victory over the St. Louis Cardinals.
September 24 – In the last game at Brooklyn's Ebbets Field in a night game, 6,702 fans watch Dodgers lefty Danny McDevitt prevail over the Pittsburgh Pirates 2–0. Brooklyn's Gil Hodges has the last RBI.
September 29 – With 1895 Giants manager Jack Doyle among the 11,606 looking on, the Giants lose their last game at the Polo Grounds 9–1 to the Pittsburgh Pirates. Pirates pitcher Bob Friend defeats Johnny Antonelli in the historic contest, and fans storm the field for souvenirs as soon as Dusty Rhodes grounds to Pittsburgh shortstop Dick Groat for the final out.

October–December
October 7 – the Los Angeles City Council approves the Chavez Ravine site for Dodger Stadium by a vote of 10 to 4.  
October 8 – Walter O'Malley announces that the Dodgers will move to Los Angeles for the 1958 season.  New York would not have a National League team again until the expansion New York Mets began play in 1962.

See also
1957 Nippon Professional Baseball season

References

External links
1957 Major League Baseball season schedule

 
Major League Baseball seasons